Elections were held in  Cagayan Valley for seats in the House of Representatives of the Philippines on May 10, 2010.

The candidate with the most votes won that district's seat for the 15th Congress of the Philippines.

Summary

Batanes

Carlo Oliver Diasnes is the incumbent.

Cagayan

1st District
Incumbent Sally Ponce Enrile is not running.

2nd District

Florencio Vargas is the incumbent.

Congressman Florencio Vargas died on July 22, a few days before the 15th Congress convened. The two other congressmen from Cagayan, Juan Ponce Enrile, Jr. and Randolph Ting, then filed a resolution declaring Vargas' seat vacant paving way for a special election. Defeated candidate and former governor Edgar Lara had previously expressed interest in participating if a special election was called, and also said that he expects any member of the Vargas family to run as well. On December 13, Representative Juan Ponce Enrile, Jr. was designated by Speaker Feliciano Belmonte, Jr. as the caretaker of the 2nd district pending the approval of a special election.

The Commission on Elections has set the election on March 12, 2011, Saturday.

3rd District
Incumbent Manuel Mamba is term-limited and is not eligible for reelection. He is running for provincial governor, and Francisco Mamba, Jr. will run as his party nominee.

The result of the election is under protest in the House of Representatives Electoral Tribunal.

Isabela

All candidates under the Lakas-Kampi-CMD banner are originally candidates of the Nationalist People's Coalition, the party the Dy patriarch, the late Governor Faustino Nang Dy Sr. helped establish before his death in 1992(?) and whose sons, notably the elder Dy's successor, Faustino Dy Jr., hold high positions within.  They were nominated by the Lakas-Kampi party after the Dy dynasty gave all-out support to the presidential candidacy of former Defense Secretary Gilbert Teodoro Jr., himself a former NPC member.

1st District
Incumbent Rodolfo Albano III is not running.  He will be the running mate of three-term 3rd District representative Faustino "Bojie" Dy III in their quest to end the six-year rule of incumbent Governor Grace Padaca; his father, former Energy Regulatory Administration Chair and three-term Representative Rodolfo Albano Jr. will run in his stead.

<

2nd District
Edwin Uy is the incumbent, and is barred from seeking re-election after serving three terms.  He will run for provincial vice governor in tandem with incumbent Governor Grace Padaca, and in turn will field his brother Edgar Uy for the post he is vacating.  Edgar Uy will face another Padaca ally, incumbent board member Ana Cristina Go.

The result of the election is under protest in the House of Representatives Electoral Tribunal.

3rd District
Incumbent Faustino Dy III is in his third consecutive term already and is ineligible for reelection; he will run for provincial governor instead. A co-member of the Dy family, Napoleon, is his party's nominee.

4th District
Giorgidi Aggabao is the incumbent.

Nueva Vizcaya

Carlos M. Padilla is the incumbent.

Quirino

Incumbent Junie Cua is in his third consecutive term already and is ineligible for reelection; he is running for the provincial governorship instead. His son, governor Dakila Carlo Cua is his party's nominee for his seat.

References

External links
Official website of the Commission on Elections

2010 Philippine general election
2010